Manga Barcelona, formerly known until 2018 as Saló del Manga de Barcelona is a Spanish anime and manga convention held annually in Barcelona, and is the largest anime convention in Spain and the second largest in all Europe.

Activities

 World Cosplay Summit, Spain Preliminaries.
 Cosplay and Karaoke competitions, European Cosplay Gathering (ECG) & EuroCosplay & WCS preliminaries.
 Video Games.
 Anime projections and conferences. 
 Matsuri and Japanese culture workshops.
 Japanese cuisine.

References

Anime conventions in Spain
Culture in Barcelona
Recurring events established in 1995
1995 establishments in Catalonia
Annual events in Catalonia
Autumn events in Spain